Breuvannes-en-Bassigny is a commune in the Haute-Marne department in northeastern France.

Population

See also
Communes of the Haute-Marne department

References

Communes of Haute-Marne